
Zervreilasee is a reservoir located south-west of Vals in the canton of Graubünden, Switzerland.

Geography 

The lake has a surface area of 1.61 km² and an elevation of 1,862 m. The maximum depth is 140 m.
The dam is 151 m high and was completed in 1957. The village of Zervreila was flooded after the construction of the dam. A 150-metre-long bridge (Canalbrücke) crosses the southern bay of the lake.

The Zervreilasee, located near the upper end of the Valser Tal, is surrounded by peaks over 3,000 metres. The highest visible from the lake is the Güferhorn (3,379 m), located on the south side. Other peaks are the Fanellhorn (3,124 m), the Frunthorn (3,030 m), Piz Scharboda (3,122 m), the Plattenberg (3,041 m) and the Furggeltihorn (3,043 m). The Zervreilahorn is a sharp peak overlooking the lake from its south-west side.

See also
List of lakes of Switzerland
List of mountain lakes of Switzerland

References
Swisstopo topographic maps

External links
Kraftwerke Zervreila 

Zervreila Dam
Lakes of Graubünden
Zervreila
Zervreila
RZervreilasee
Vals, Switzerland